Boys, Boys, Boys is the third studio album by American singer-songwriter Lesley Gore. The album was released in April, 1964.

Track listing

Charts

References

Lesley Gore albums
1964 albums
Albums arranged by Claus Ogerman
Albums produced by Quincy Jones
Mercury Records albums